I Want It is the debut single released by Chanelle Hayes. Her progress during the making of the song was filmed as the reality TV show Chanelle: Wannabe Popstar shown on VH1 and TMF TV Channels. The official remix video included on the single is the 7th Heaven Radio Mix by Ministry of Sound.  The single was released as both a physical CD and download version on Monday 12 May 2008 and entered the Official UK Singles Chart on 18 May 2008.

The 7th Heaven and Club Junkies Remixes of the song reached top 10 in combined DJ club charts.  Highest position No.2 in the UK Pop Club Charts (30/04/08) and No.9 in the Upfront Club Charts.

Track listing
I Want It—Original Mix
I Want It—7th Heaven Radio Mix
I Want It—7th Heaven Club Mix 
I Want It—Enhanced Video (7th Heaven Radio Mix)

Charts

References

2008 debut singles
2008 songs
Songs written by Ben Ofoedu